Helen Marie Bøsterud (born 15 February 1940) is a Norwegian politician for the Labour Party. She was the state secretary to the Minister of Social Affairs 1980–1981, and later Minister of Justice 1986–1989.

References

1940 births
Living people
Government ministers of Norway
Members of the Storting
Labour Party (Norway) politicians
Women government ministers of Norway
20th-century Norwegian women politicians
20th-century Norwegian politicians
Women members of the Storting
Female justice ministers
Ministers of Justice of Norway